Herbert Edward Matthews (2 September 1894 – 2 June 1964) was an Australian rules footballer who played for South Melbourne, Richmond and Melbourne in the Victorian Football League (VFL).

After being part of North Melbourne's strong Victorian Football Association (VFA) combination, Matthews had a slow start to his VFL career. He made just one appearance in his debut season, at South Melbourne, which prompted him to cross to Richmond where he added only three more matches.

When the war ended he returned to league football again and lined up for Melbourne in the 1919 season, rucking regularly for them during his four years at the club. He made a return to South Melbourne in 1923, joining Roy Cazaly in the ruck and he played in a losing preliminary final.

In 1925, Matthews was appointed as captain/coach of Benalla in the Ovens & Murray Football League, but a week he later turned down the position.

His son, Herbie Matthews, later won a Brownlow Medal and his grandson of the same name also played with South Melbourne.

Notes

References
Holmesby, Russell and Main, Jim (2007). The Encyclopedia of AFL Footballers. 7th ed. Melbourne: Bas Publishing.

External links

1894 births
1964 deaths
Australian rules footballers from Victoria (Australia)
Australian Rules footballers: place kick exponents
Sydney Swans players
Richmond Football Club players
Melbourne Football Club players
North Melbourne Football Club (VFA) players